John Milton Andrews (born November 2, 1948) is a former American football tight end and running back who played three seasons in the National Football League (NFL) for the Baltimore Colts and San Diego Chargers.

Early life
John Andrews was born on November 2, 1948 in Indianapolis, Indiana. He went to high school at Shortridge High School.

College career
He went to college at Indiana. He did not play football in 1968 or in 1969. In 1970 he had 36 catches for 417 yards and two touchdowns. In 1971 he had 29 receptions for 268 yards and one touchdown. He also had one rush for 18 yards.

Professional career

Baltimore Colts

Andrews was drafted in the 5th round (130) of the 1971 NFL Draft by the Baltimore Colts. He did not play for them that season.

San Diego Chargers

In 1972, he was traded to the San Diego Chargers. He only appeared in week one; a 3–34 loss against the San Francisco 49ers. He wore number 81 for the Chargers.

Baltimore Colts (second stint)

In 1973, he was signed by the team that drafted him, the Baltimore Colts. From week 1 to week three he did not have any statistics. In week 4 he had his first stat; a 13-yard kickoff return. In week 8 he had a one-yard touchdown catch. He only had one catch in the 1973 season. In 1974, he had 5 rushes for 6 yards.

Tampa Bay Buccaneers
In 1976, he signed with the Tampa Bay Buccaneers but was released before the first pre-season game.

References

1948 births
Living people
American football running backs
American football tight ends
Baltimore Colts players
Indiana Hoosiers football players
Players of American football from Indianapolis
San Diego Chargers players
Tampa Bay Buccaneers players